Albert John Trillo (London, 4 July 1915 – 2 August 1992, Wenhaston, Suffolk) was a Church of England bishop.

John Trillo (as he was generally known) grew up in Cricklewood, North London, and was educated at the Quintin School and King's College, London. On leaving school he worked in the film industry, for British Lion, and obtained his BA degree as a part-time student.  He was ordained in 1938 and was a curate at Christ Church, Fulham before becoming the priest in charge of St Michael's, Cricklewood. From 1945 he worked for the Student Christian Movement, pioneering its work in Yorkshire grammar schools and becoming its secretary.  From 1950-1955 he was rector of Friern Barnet and a lecturer in divinity at King's College, London.

In 1955, Trillo was appointed the principal of Bishop's College, Cheshunt, and remained there until his consecration to the episcopate as the Bishop of Bedford in 1963. He became the Bishop of Hertford in 1968 and the Bishop of Chelmsford in 1971. In retirement he continued to serve as an assistant bishop for a further seven years.

References

1915 births
1992 deaths
People educated at Quintin Kynaston School
Alumni of King's College London
Associates of King's College London
Academics of King's College London
Bishops of Bedford
Bishops of Hertford
Bishops of Chelmsford
20th-century Church of England bishops